At the 1997 Mediterranean Games, the athletics events were held at the Stadio San Nicola in Bari, Italy from 15–19 June 1997. A total of forty-three events were contested, of which 23 by male and 20 by female athletes. A total of 24 Games records were broken or equalled during the competition.

The host country, Italy, topped the medal table with twelve gold medals and a total haul of 36 medals – by far the largest. France was the second most successful nation with ten golds and 23 medals, while Greece with seven golds and 19 overall. Morocco, Algeria, Spain and Slovenia also featured prominently on the podiums. Fourteen nations had medal winning athletes in the competition.

Greece won both the 100 metres titles through Angelos Pavlakakis and Ekaterini Thanou, both of whom ran meet record times. Christine Arron won the women's 200 metres and 4×100 metres relay for France. Morocco's Nezha Bidouane took the women's 400 metres hurdles title, an event in which she would later win at the 1997 World Championships.

Medal summary

Men

Women

Medal table

Participation

References

Results
Affiche officielle des JM de Bari 1997. CIJM. Retrieved on 2011-01-22.
Mediterranean Games – Past Medallists. GBR Athletics. Retrieved on 2011-01-22.

Med
Athletics
1997